Lanthanum diiodide is an iodide of lanthanum, with the chemical formula of LaI2. It is an electride, actually having a chemical formula of  La3+[(I−)2e−].

Preparation 

Lanthanum diiodide can be obtained from the reduction of lanthanum(III) iodide with lanthanum metal under a vacuum at 800 to 900 °C:

It can also be obtained by reacting lanthanum and mercury(II) iodide:

It was first created by John D. Corbett in 1961.

Properties 

Lanthanum diiodide is a blue-black solid with metallic lustre, which is easily hydrolyzed into the iodide oxide. It has a MoSi2-type structure, with the space group I4/mmm (No. 139).

References 

Lanthanum compounds
Iodides
Electrides
Substances discovered in the 1960s